Mount Melton is a squarish mountain  west of Tent Peak in the Kyle Hills of Ross Island, Antarctica. The mountain was named by the Advisory Committee on Antarctic Names in 2000 after Terry Melton, a power plant mechanic/facilities engineer at Palmer Station, June 1981 to January 1983. Melton worked nine WINFLY/summer seasons at McMurdo Sound as Williams Field facilities engineer/site supervisor, McMurdo operations superintendent, and McMurdo area manager, 1984–93, and then as National Science Foundation McMurdo Station manager from October 1998 to October 1999.

References

Mountains of Ross Island